School for Integrated Academics and Technologies, or SIATech, is a network of tuition-free public charter high schools with school sites in Arkansas, California, and Florida. SIATech schools in Florida operate under the MYcroSchool name. All SIATech Charter High Schools are nonprofit 501(c)3 organizations and offer a standard high school diploma. Job Corps and Workforce Innovation and Opportunity Act (WIOA) are located and partnered with SIATech Campuses.

SIATech received a five-year accreditation from AdvancedED for the central office and all subsidiary programs associated with SIATech and MYcroSchool. All SIATech schools are fully accredited by additional agencies that are also recognized by the US Department of Education. Campuses in Little Rock, Arkansas are accredited by AdvancedED. SIATech campuses in California are accredited by the Western Association of Schools and Colleges (WASC). Campuses in Florida are accredited by the Southern Association of Schools and Colleges (SACS CASI).

Locations 
As of 2016, SIATech has twenty three Charter High School campuses in California, Florida, and Arkansas. The SIATech Administrative Offices are based in Oceanside, California.

References

External links 
 SIATech Schools

Educational organizations based in the United States